Portway Bristol could refer to:

Portway Bristol F.C., a former football club based in Bristol
Portway, Bristol a road in the City of Bristol that follows the River Avon